Armadillo World Headquarters (The 'Dillo or Armadillo WHQ) was an influential Texas music hall and beer garden in Austin at 525 Barton Springs Road – at South First Street – just south of the Colorado River and downtown Austin.  The 'Dillo flourished from 1970 to 1980. The structure that housed it, an old National Guard Armory, was demolished in 1981 and replaced by a 13-story office building.

History

In 1970, Austin's flagship rock music venue, the Vulcan Gas Company, closed, leaving the city's nascent and burgeoning live music scene without an incubator. One night, Eddie Wilson, manager of the local group Shiva's Headband, stepped outside a nightclub where the band was playing and noticed an old, abandoned National Guard armory. Wilson found an unlocked garage door on the building and was able to view the cavernous interior using the headlights of his automobile. He had a desire to continue the legacy of the Vulcan Gas Company, and was inspired by what he saw in the armory to create a new music hall in the derelict structure. The armory was estimated to have been built in 1948, but no records of its construction could be or have been located. The building was ugly, uncomfortable, and had poor acoustics, but offered cheap rent and a central location.  Posters for the venue usually noted the address as 525 Barton Springs Road (Rear), behind the Skating Palace.

The name for the Armadillo was inspired by the use of armadillos as a symbol in the artwork of Jim Franklin, a local poster artist, and from the building itself.  In choosing the mascot for the new venture, Wilson and his partners wanted an "armored" animal since the building was an old armory. The nine-banded armadillo (Dasypus novemcinctus) was chosen because of its hard shell that looks like armor, its history as a survivor (virtually unchanged for almost 50 million years), and its near-ubiquity in Central Texas.  Wilson also believed the building looked like it had been some type of headquarters at one time. He initially proposed "International Headquarters" but in the end it became "World Headquarters."

In founding the Armadillo World Headquarters, Wilson was assisted by Jim Franklin, Mike Tolleson (né Robert Michael Tolleson; born 1942), an entertainment attorney licensed by the State Bar of Texas in 1968, Bobby Hedderman from the Vulcan Gas Company and Hank Alrich.  Funding for the venture was initially provided by Shiva's Headband founder's father, Dan Perskin, and Mad Dog, Inc. an Austin literati group that included Bud Shrake.

The Armadillo World Headquarters officially opened on August 7, 1970, with Shiva's Headband, the Hub City Movers, and Whistler performing.

The Armadillo caught on quickly with the hippie culture of Austin because admission was inexpensive and the hall tolerated cannabis use. Even though illicit drug use was flagrant, the Armadillo was never raided. Anecdotes suggest the police were worried about having to bust their fellow officers as well as local and state politicians.

Soon, the Armadillo started receiving publicity in national magazines such as Rolling Stone. In a story from its September 9, 1974, edition, Time magazine wrote that the Armadillo was to the Austin music scene what The Fillmore had been to the emergence of rock music in the 1960s. The clientele became a mixture of hippies, cowboys, and businessmen who stopped by to have lunch and a beer and listen to live music. As Gary Nunn put it, "It's been said that our music was the catalyst that brought the shit-kickers and the hippies together at the Armadillo." At its peak, the amount of Lone Star draft beer sold by the Armadillo was second only to the Houston Astrodome. The Neiman Marcus department store even offered a line of Armadillo-branded products.

The unique blend of country and rock music performed at the hall became known by the terms "The Austin Sound," "Redneck Rock," progressive country or "Cosmic Cowboy." Artists that almost single-handedly defined this particular genre and sound were Michael Martin Murphey, Jerry Jeff Walker and The Lost Gonzo Band. Many upcoming and established acts such as Willie Nelson, Waylon Jennings, Ray Charles, Stevie Ray Vaughan and ZZ Top played the Armadillo. Freddy Fender, Freddie King, Frank Zappa, Commander Cody and His Lost Planet Airmen, The Sir Douglas Quintet all recorded live albums there. Bruce Springsteen played five shows during 1974. The Australian band AC/DC played their first American show at the Armadillo with Canadian band Moxy in July 1977.  The Clash played live at The Armadillo with Joe Ely on October 4, 1979 (a photo from that show appears on the band's London Calling album) and the notorious Austin punk band The Skunks.

Despite its successes, the Armadillo always struggled financially. The addition of the Armadillo Beer Garden in 1972 and the subsequent establishment of food service were both bids to generate steady cash flow. However, the financial difficulties continued. In an interview for the 2010 book Weird City, Eddie Wilson remarked:

"People don't remember this part: the months and months of drudgery. People talk about the Armadillo like it was a huge success, but there were months where hardly anyone showed up. After the first night when no one really came I ended up crying myself to sleep up on stage."

This predicament was blamed on a combination of large guaranteed payments for the acts, cheap ticket prices, and poor promotion. The club finally had to lay off staff members in late 1976 and file for Chapter 11 bankruptcy in 1977. The Armadillo's landlord sold the property for an amount estimated between $4 million and $8 million.

The final concert at the Armadillo took place on December 31, 1980. The sold-out New Year's Eve show featured Asleep at the Wheel and Commander Cody and the Lost Planet Airmen. Some reports say the show ended at 4 am, while others claim that the bands played until dawn. The contents of the Armadillo were sold at auction in January 1981, and the old armory was razed for a high-rise office building.

Live recordings made at the Armadillo

Progressive country, rock, blues, punk

 Commander Cody and His Lost Planet Airmen: Sleazy Roadside Stories
 Recorded December 1973, released in 1988; 
 Commander Cody and His Lost Planet Airmen: Live from Deep in the Heart of Texas (1974); 
 Frank Zappa, Captain Beefheart, The Mothers: Bongo Fury (1975)
 Frank Zappa (lead guitar, vocals); George Duke (keyboards); Captain Beefheart (harmonica, vocals, shoppy bags); Bruce Fowler (trombone); Tom Fowler (bass); Denny Walley (guitar, vocals); Terry Bozzio (drums)
 Recorded May 20 & 21, 1975; "200 Years Old" and "Muffin Man" intros were recorded in January and February 1974 at the Record Plant, Los Angeles;  
 Back-side of the album cover: "Special thanks to the kitchen staff at The Armadillo, especially Jan Beeman" (née Janelle Gay Hopper; 1934–2007)
 New Riders of the Purple Sage: Armadillo World Headquarters, Austin, TX, 6/13/75 (1975)
 Sir Douglas Quintet, Freddy Fender, Roky Erickson: Re-Union of the Cosmic Brothers (1975)
 Waylon Jennings: Waylon:Live (1976)
 Sir Douglas Quintet: Live Love (1977)
 Doug Sahm, Augie Meyers & Friends: Wanted: Dead or Alive (1977)
 The Bugs Henderson Group: At Last – Recorded Live on Stage (1978)
 The Cobras: Live & Deadly
 Cobras: Denny Freeman (guitar), Larry Lange (bass), Rodney Craig (drums), Joe Sublett (né Joseph M. Sublett; born 1953) (saxophone), Paul J. Constantine (born 1950) (trumpet), Larry Medlow "Junior Medlow" Williams Jr. (1953–1997) (vocals, rhythm guitar), also with Angela Strehli & Paul Ray (né Paul Henry Ray; 1942–2016) (vocals) 
 Recorded November 1979, released in 2011;

Jazz

 Freddie King; with David "Fathead" Newman and Jerry Jumonville: Larger Than Life (some tracks, not full record)
 Freddie King (vocals, guitar); John Thomas, Darrell Leonard (trumpets); Jerry Jumonville (tenor and alto sax); David "Fathead" Newman (tenor sax); Jim Gordon (né James Wells Gordon) (tenor sax, organ); Joe Davis (né Joe Lane Davis; 1941–1995) (bari sax); Alvin Hemphill (organ); K.O. Thomas, Louis Stephens (piano); Michael O'Neill and Andrew "Jr. Boy" Jones (guitar); Robert G. Wilson (1956–2010), Bennie Turner (bass guitar); Charles Myers, Big John E. Thomassie (1949–1996) (drums); Sam Clayton (congas)
 Recorded April 1975; RSO SO-4811
 Carla Bley
 Mike Mantler (trumpet); Gary Windo (sax); Alan Michael Braufman (saxophone); John Clark (French horn); George E. Lewis (trombone); Bob Stewart (tuba); Blue Gene Tyranny (keyboards); Patty Price (bass); Phillip Wilson (drums)
 Recorded March 27, 1978; Hi Hat HHHCD3112
 Phil Woods Quartet – 2 releases: Live (1978) and More Live
 Mike Melillo (piano); Steve Gilmore (bass); Bill Goodwin (drums)
 Anthony Braxton (solo alto sax) (1978)
 Recorded October, 1978; released March 2011, Braxton Bootleg Records BL007

Selected people

Music poster artists (alphabetical) 
Posters by the following artists were part of the iconic artwork that helped define Armadillo World Headquarters in the 1970s – "The Armadillo Art Squad:"

 Michael Edward Arth (de) (born 1953)
 Kerry Awn
 Ken Featherston (né Kenneth Wayne Featherston; 1951–1975)
 
 Danny Garrett
 Henry Gonzalez (né Enrique Barrientos Gonzalez; 1950–2016)
 Guy Juke
 Bill Narum (né William Albert Narum; 1947–2009)
 Micael Priest (1951–2018)
 Dale Wilkins (né Dale Evan Wilkins; born 1949)
 Sam Yeates (né Samuel Wade Yeates; born 1951)

Photographer 

Vermont-born Burton Wilson (né Burton Estey Wilson; 1919–2014) – no relation to Eddie – was the de facto house photographer for the Vulcan Gas Company and Armadillo World Headquarters. Eddie Wilson once told him, "Just tell anybody who asks that you own the place. That way, you'll never need a backstage pass."

Legacy

Historical marker 

On August 19, 2006, the City of Austin dedicated a commemorative historical plaque that had been installed in the parking lot of One Texas Center, where the Armadillo once stood. The Texas Monthly, in its 1999 "Best of the Texas Century" edition, named Armadillo World Headquarters as the "Venue of the Century."

See also
 Folk Music Club
 Music of Austin

Annotations

Notes

References

News media

Books, journals, magazines, and papers

 
 
 
  poster – Note: an original poster – 11 3/16 in. (284.2 mm) × 16 13/16 in. (427.0 mm) – is held by the Dolph Briscoe Center for American History
 
 
 
 
 
 
  (preview via Google Books)
 
 
 
 
 
  (the book began as an article for Texas Monthly and was then expanded and published by Heidelberg Publishers in Austin)
  (alternate link, limited search, via HathiTrust). Note: Richards, the author, distinguished his career in Texas as a civil rights lawyer; from 1953 to 1984, he was the husband of Ann Richards; a year before they divorced, Ann Richards was elected Texas State Treasurer, which won her the distinction of becoming the first woman (since Ma Ferguson) in 50 years to be elected to a state-wide office; after their divorce, she went on to become the Texas Governor.
 
 
 
 
 
 
 
 
  The Texas Times is a bygone tabloid, monthly except June, printed by the Texas Student Publications, Inc. (UT Austin), under the auspices of the University of Texas System; it launched September 1968

Audio-visual media

Government and genealogical archives

  (searching "Burton Estey Wilson," born October 19, 1919, Derby, Vermont; GS Film: 2073394; Digital Folder: 7011700; Image 1690 of 2859; citing Secretary of State; State Capitol Building; Montpelier)

External links

 awhq.com – Armadillo World Headquarters Official Site (website registrant is Threadgill's Restaurant – officially known as Threadgill's Restaurants, Inc. – which, since the mid-1970s, has been owned by Edwin Osbourne Wilson, co-founder of Armadillo World Headquarters) 

Demolished music venues in the United States
Culture of Austin, Texas
Music of Austin, Texas
Music venues in Austin, Texas